The 2009–10 South Carolina men's basketball team represented University of South Carolina during the 2009–10 college basketball season. The head coach was Darrin Horn who was in his second season with the Gamecocks. The team played its home games at the 18,000-seat Colonial Life Arena in Columbia, South Carolina. All games were produced and broadcast locally by the Gamecock Sports Radio Network. They finished the season 15–16, 6–10 in Southeastern Conference play and lost in the
first round of the 2010 SEC men's basketball tournament to Alabama. The Gamecocks were not invited to a post season tournament. The highlight of the season was a home upset of #1 Kentucky on January 26.

Regular season
On December 21, 2009, it was announced that senior starting forward Dominique Archie would miss the rest of the season due to knee surgery required to repair an injury he suffered early in the Miami game. The Gamecocks played all games in the month of December without Archie and junior starter Mike Holmes after he suffered facial injuries during Thanksgiving break. Holmes was subsequently dismissed from the basketball team on January 1, 2010, for a repeated violation of team rules.

On January 26, 2010, Carolina won their first game in school history over a #1 ranked team, beating the undefeated (19-0) Kentucky Wildcats, 68-62.

Roster

2010 Commitments

Schedule and results

|-
!colspan=6 style=| Exhibition

|-
!colspan=6 style=| Non-conference regular season

|-
!colspan=6 style=| SEC regular season

|-
!colspan=9 style=|SEC tournament

Awards
Devan Downey
First Team All-SEC (AP and Coaches)
Honorable Mention AP All-American
Oscar Robertson National Player Of The Week, 1/31/10
SEC Player of the Week, 2/1/10
Bob Cousy Award Finalist
Oscar Robertson Trophy Finalist
Preseason First Team All-SEC
Naismith Trophy Preseason Watchlist
John R. Wooden Award Preseason Candidate
Dominique Archie
Preseason Second Team All-SEC

References

South Carolina Gamecocks
South Carolina Gamecocks men's basketball seasons
Game
Game